The Boy Who Knew Too Much is the second studio album by British singer-songwriter Mika. It was released on 21 September 2009, under Casablanca/Universal Republic in the United States and Island in the United Kingdom.

Background
Mika worked with producer Greg Wells, who also produced his debut album Life in Cartoon Motion. The album was written in Olympic Studios, London, which began in June 2008. In September 2008 he moved to Rocket Carousel Studios, Los Angeles, where the album was recorded. Mika has described the album's themes as dealing with his teenage years, and "in a sense is kind of part two" of his first album. In contrast to his first album, which "contained innocent fairytales", Mika pitches the new album's songs as "gothic Tim Burton-esque fantasies."

The album was originally titled We Are Golden after the first single from the album, "We Are Golden". On 20 July 2009 in an on-air interview with DJ Jo Whiley on BBC Radio 1, Mika revealed he was considering renaming the album, because he wanted "something a little more ridiculous." On 6 August 2009 it was confirmed that the album's title would change to The Boy Who Knew Too Much. As with Mika's debut album Life in Cartoon Motion, the album artwork has been designed by Mika's sister (who works under the nom de plume DaWack), the Australian illustrator Sophie Blackall, Airside collaborator Richard Hogg and Mika himself. The artwork has been inspired by children's picture books from the 1940s to 1970s.

Critical response

The album received generally positive reviews from music critics, based on an aggregate score of 70/100 from Metacritic.

Singles
 "We Are Golden" was the first single from the album. It received its UK radio debut on BBC Radio 2 on 20 July 2009. It peaked at number 4 on the UK Singles Chart. 
"Rain" was the second UK and German single, released on 23 November 2009 in both digital and physical format. It peaked at number 72 on the UK Singles Chart, making it Mika's first UK single to miss the top 40. In Germany it peaked at number 56. It was released as the third UK single, on 15 February 2010.
"Blame It on the Girls" was the second American and Japanese single from the album. It peaked at number one in Japan but failed to make any impact in the United States. It was released as the third UK single, on 15 February 2010. It peaked at number 72.
The song "Good Gone Girl" charted within the Romanian Top 100 on airplay only, without being released as a single.

Track listing

Personnel
Mika – vocals, piano, keyboards, background vocals, background violin

Additional musicians

Walter Afanasieff – percussion, keyboards
The Andrae Crouch Choir – background vocals
Lorna Bridge – background vocals
Paul Buckmaster – strings
Matt Chamberlain – drums, percussion
Andrew Dermanis – additional vocals
Gary Grant – horns
Jerry Hey – horns
Imogen Heap – drums, background vocals, keyboard
Dan Higgins – horns
Alex Millar – background vocals
Audrey Moukataff – background vocals
Chris Nicolaides – background vocals

Cherisse Osei – drums
Owen Pallett – violin
Tim Pierce – guitar
Fortune Penniman – background vocals
Paloma Penniman – background vocals, additional vocals
Zuleika Penniman – background vocals
Bill Reichenbach Jr. – horns
Dan Rothchild – bass guitar, background vocals
Fabien Waltmann – keyboards
Martin Waugh – guitar, background vocals
Greg Wells – keyboards, drums, bass, percussion, guitar
Ida Falk Winland – background vocals
Lyle Workman – guitar

Charts and certifications

Weekly charts

Year-end charts

Certifications

Release history

References

External links
 MikaSounds.com – Mika's official website
 Mika on YouTube

2009 albums
Casablanca Records albums
Mika (singer) albums
Albums produced by Greg Wells